WMVS (channel 10) is a PBS member television station in Milwaukee, Wisconsin, United States. It is owned by Milwaukee Area Technical College alongside secondary PBS member WMVT (channel 36). Collectively branded as Milwaukee PBS, the two stations share studios at the Continuing Education Center on the MATC campus on North 8th Street in downtown Milwaukee, and transmitter facilities on North Humboldt Boulevard in Milwaukee's Estabrook Park neighborhood.

WMVS and WMVT operate separately from the PBS Wisconsin state network owned by the University of Wisconsin Extension and serves the rest of the state; however, WMVT runs instructional television programs from PBS Wisconsin, and Milwaukee Area Technical College and Milwaukee PBS coordinate instructional television efforts for their broadcast area.

History

The station first signed on the air on October 28, 1957, as the 28th educational television station in the United States and the second in Wisconsin (after WHA-TV in Madison). It was a service of the Milwaukee Vocational School, forerunner of MATC–hence its call letters.

Among the strongest and earliest backers of the creation of Milwaukee Public Television (over the opposition of at least some of the area's commercial stations) was Frank Zeidler, who served as the mayor of Milwaukee from 1948 to 1960. In 2007, WMVS celebrated its 50th anniversary of broadcasting. Upon a September 2010 realignment of its digital signal, the station's changed its on-air branding to "Milwaukee Public Television, Channel 10-HD". Another switch in branding occurred in December 2016, when MPTV was re-branded to Milwaukee PBS.

The two Milwaukee PBS stations, WMVS and WMVT, have the unique distinction of their studio's address number incorporating the channel numbers for both of the stations, which is in Milwaukee's street numbering system (most television and radio stations that have their channel number as an address use a vanity address or street not within a community's numbering system, e.g. KLAS-TV channel 8 in Las Vegas is located on Channel 8 Drive). The studios are in the Continuing Education Center of the MATC Downtown Campus, at 1036 North 8th Street.

WMVS has long been one of the highest-rated PBS stations in the country. In the February 2019 sweeps period, it became the highest-rated station in the PBS system.

Digital television

WMVS' digital signal on VHF channel 8 broadcasts its main channel, on virtual channel 10.1, in the 720p high definition format.

Analog-to-digital conversion
WMVS' digital signal was previously carried on digital channel 35, which is the designated digital channel of WMVT, due to interference issues with the analog channel 8 signal of WOOD-TV in Grand Rapids until a channel realignment on September 1, 2008. WMVS shut down its analog signal, over VHF channel 10, at 9 a.m. on June 12, 2009, the official date in which full-power television stations in the United States transitioned from analog to digital broadcasts under federal mandate. The station's digital signal continued to broadcasts on its pre-transition VHF channel 8. Through the use of PSIP, digital television receivers display the station's virtual channel as its former VHF analog channel 10.

On September 1, 2010, another channel realignment took place which added three of MPTV's digital subchannels to WMVS' signal bandwidth, while a standard definition simulcast of WMVS' 10.1 feed was added to digital subchannel 36.2 for over-the-air viewers who were unable to receive WMVS' VHF signal since the conversion (or only have UHF antennas; outside of WMVS and WIWN, all of Milwaukee's other stations transmit on UHF signals), an issue that has plagued many stations continuing to broadcast on VHF post-transition. The picture format on 10.1 was also reduced from 1080i to 720p to enable multicasting on WMVS' bandwidth. A secondary translator station for WMVS, broadcasting on UHF channel 36 and holding the calls WMVS-LD, was launched on August 14, 2012 from the MPTV Tower to better serve the main portion of WMVS' service area with UHF-only antennas, along with a boost in power to the main WMVS signal courtesy of a Public Telecommunications Facilities Program award. The secondary translator carried WMVS' main feed and all three of its subchannels, but identified each channel via PSIP as "10.1X" to reduce confusion with the main channel and allow viewers to choose which signal serves their needs better. The translator service was temporarily ended in mid-June 2020 as another after-effect of the spectrum auction where it was required to end service, as 36 is the last channel in the new UHF bandplan and will eventually be the physical channel for WMKE-CD. Milwaukee PBS currently has a construction permit active to restore WMVS-LD on VHF channel 10.

Programming

Local programming
In 1970, WMVS created its first series that would be distributed to PBS member stations, the physical fitness program Hathayoga, which ran until 1975 and hosted by Kathleen Hitchcock, which would go on to be a favorite among viewers. Since then, WMVS has produced or created a wide range of all of the station's weekly local programs, which include Black Nouveau, ¡Adelante! (a Spanish-language program with English subtitles), I Remember, Outdoor Wisconsin and Interchange. Tracks Ahead, which premiered in 1990, also is produced in HD, and was previously syndicated by Milwaukee PBS for broadcast on the HDNet (now AXS TV) cable channel.

The station's annual fundraising auction in late April/early May (which started in 1969, and is one of the oldest station auction campaigns in existence) was broadcast in high definition since 2003. After major changes in the station's fundraising arm, the sale of its production facility in 2017, and changes in overall shopping habits (and a move to WMVT that same year to reduce schedule disruptions), the auction's last edition was in 2019, with more direct fundraising appeals and PBS' pay-to-access Passport streaming video platform taking its place.

References

External links
Official website
Karin Ades papers document WMVS/WMVT activities and can be found at the University of Maryland Libraries.

PBS member stations
Television channels and stations established in 1957
1957 establishments in Wisconsin
Public broadcasting in Wisconsin
MVS
Local AccuWeather Channel affiliates